Paul Bojack is an American film director and writer. His feature films Resilience and Glass, Necktie received acclaim from major publications and distribution in the United States, Canada and abroad. His short films Don't Call Me and The Truth About Mutual Funds screened at various U.S. festivals. The screenplay for Resilience was acquired by the Library of The Academy of Motion Picture Arts and Sciences for its permanent core collection.

Filmography
Feature films
Resilience
Glass, Necktie

Short films
Don't Call Me (The Infidel)
The Truth About Mutual Funds

References

External links
Filmthreat.com
Filmthreat.com
Scriptlist.oscars.org

Year of birth missing (living people)
Living people
American film directors